The 2005 Kelly Cup Playoffs of the ECHL began on April 12, 2005. 16 teams qualified for the playoffs. In the American Conference, the top eight teams qualified for the playoffs. In the National Conference, the top four teams from each division qualified for the playoffs.

The Kelly Cup Final ended on June 1, 2005, with the Trenton Titans defeating the Florida Everblades four games to two to win the first Kelly Cup in team history. Trenton forward Leon Hayward was named the Kelly Cup Playoffs Most Valuable Player.

Playoff Format

American Conference
The top eight teams in the conference qualified for the 2005 Kelly Cup playoffs, with the division champions seeded 1 and 2 and the remaining six teams seeded 3 through 8 based on points. The Conference quarterfinals featured a best-of-5 series with the higher seeds (1, 2, 3 and 4) versus the lower seeds (8, 7, 6 and 5). The Conference semifinals featured a best-of-5 series as well as a reseeding with the highest remaining seeds hosting the lowest remaining seeds. The Conference finals featured a best-of-seven series with the winner crowned the American Conference champion and granted a berth in the Kelly Cup Finals.

National Conference
The top four teams in each of the North and West divisions qualified for the 2005 Kelly Cup playoffs. Each divisions' champion would be seeded first in the best-of-5 Division Semifinals hosting the fourth seed from their division, while the second seeds would play the third seeds. The winners of each Division semifinal would move on to the best-of-5 division finals. The winners of the two division finals play in a best-of-seven conference final. The winner of the conference final was crowned the National Conference champions and granted a berth in the Kelly Cup Finals

Kelly Cup Finals
The Kelly Cup Finals will be a best-of-seven series between the two conference champions.

Playoff Seeds 
After the 2005–06 ECHL regular season, 19 teams qualified for the playoffs. The Alaska Aces were the National Conference regular season champions, as well the Henry Brabham Cup winners with the best regular season record. The Gwinnett Gladiators were the National Conference regular season champions.

American Conference 
Pensacola Ice Pilots – South Division and American Conference champions; Brabham Cup winners, 107 points
Columbia Inferno – East Division champions, 88 points
Florida Everblades – 94 points
Gwinnett Gladiators – 88 points
Mississippi Sea Wolves – 87 points
South Carolina Stingrays – 87 points
Charlotte Checkers – 85 points
Greenville Grrrowl – 83 points

National Conference

North Division 
Reading Royals – 93 points
Trenton Titans – 93 points
Atlantic City Boardwalk Bullies – 92 points
Toledo Storm – 87 points

West Division 
Alaska Aces – National Conference regular season champions – 98 points
Long Beach Ice Dogs – 95 points
Idaho Steelheads – 91 points
Bakersfield Condors – 90 points

Playoff Brackets

First round 
Note 1: All times are local.
Note 2: Game times in italics signify games to be played only if necessary.
Note 3: Home team is listed first.

American Conference quarterfinals

(1) Pensacola Ice Pilots vs. (8) Greenville Grrrowl

(2) Columbia Inferno vs. (7) Charlotte Checkers

(3) Florida Everblades vs. (6) South Carolina Stingrays

(4) Gwinnett Gladiators vs. (5) Mississippi Sea Wolves

National Conference division semifinals

(N. 1) Reading Royals vs. (N. 4) Toledo Storm

(N. 2) Trenton Titans vs. (N. 3) Atlantic City Boardwalk Bullies

(W. 1) Alaska Aces vs. (W. 4) Bakersfield Condors

(W. 2) Long Beach Ice Dogs vs. (W. 3) Idaho Steelheads

2nd Round

American Conference semifinals

(3) Florida Everblades vs. (8) Greenville Grrrowl

(4) Gwinnett Gladiators vs. (7) Charlotte Checkers

National Conference division finals

(N. 1) Reading Royals vs. (N. 2) Trenton Titans

(W. 1) Alaska Aces vs. (W. 2) Long Beach Ice Dogs

Conference Finals

American Conference

(3) Florida Everblades vs. (7) Charlotte Checkers

National Conference

(W. 1) Alaska Aces vs. (N. 2) Trenton Titans

2005 Kelly Cup Finals

(A. 3) Florida Everblades vs. (N. 2) Trenton Titans

See also 
 2004–05 ECHL season
 List of ECHL seasons

Kelly Cup playoffs
2004–05 ECHL season